Live Magic is the second live album by British rock band Queen. It was recorded at various live shows during The Magic Tour and was released on 1 December 1986. However, it was not released in the United States until August 1996. It received strong criticism from fans, due to the heavy editing of many songs. For example, the opera section was removed from "Bohemian Rhapsody", the second verse and chorus were removed from "Tie Your Mother Down", and "Is This the World We Created...?", "We Will Rock You" and "We Are the Champions" were reduced to one verse and chorus. 

Most of the performances were recorded at Knebworth Park on 9 August 1986, which marks the band's final ever concert with its original line-up.

Track listing

Release history

Charts

Certifications

Personnel
Freddie Mercury - lead vocals, piano, keyboards
Brian May - guitars, backing vocals
Roger Taylor - drums, backing vocals
John Deacon - bass guitar, backing vocals
Spike Edney - keyboards, guitar, backing vocals

References

External links
 Queen official website: Discography: Live Magic: includes lyrics of "Under Pressure", "Another One Bites the Dust", "I Want to Break Free", "Is This the World We Created...?", "Radio Ga Ga", "We Are the Champions".

Queen (band) live albums
1986 live albums
Live albums recorded at Wembley Stadium
Hollywood Records live albums